Tigrosa aspersa is a large (up to one-inch (25 mm) body length) wolf spider that inhabits the eastern United States. Compared to its close relative Tigrosa helluo, T. aspersa is much larger. This species was known as Hogna aspersa prior to 2012, when it was moved to Tigrosa.

A different species (Lycosa implacida) was named Lycosa aspersa in 1849 by Nicolet by accident.

References

External links
Photo

Lycosidae
Spiders of the United States
Spiders described in 1844
Taxa named by Nicholas Marcellus Hentz